Utawarerumono is a 26-episode anime television series based on the visual novel of the same name by Leaf. The series aired in Japan between April 3 and September 25, 2006. With the first DVD release of the anime on August 23, 2006, a short bonus episode lasting about seven minutes was also included. The opening theme is "Musōka" by Suara, the first ending theme used for the first 25 episodes is "Madoromi no Rinne" by Eri Kawai, and the second ending theme used for the final episode is "Kimi ga Tame" by Suara. The North American rights to the Utawarerumono anime were initially held by ADV Films for US$109,201 effective August 1, 2006, who completed a full DVD release of the entire series. In July 2008, Funimation announced that the license to Utawarerumono (and other titles formerly held by ADV) had transferred to them.

A three-episode Utawarerumono original video animation (OVA) series was developed by the creators of the anime. These episodes focus on side stories from the game which were not covered in the TV series. The first OVA was released on June 5, 2009. The OVA's opening theme is "Adamant Faith" by Suara and its ending theme is "Yume no Tsuzuki" by Rena Uehara. In the first OVA, the episode focuses mainly on Urutori's relationship with the child rescued from Niwe's attack, and how she refuses to give up the child to another family, going so far as to attack her friends.

Episode list

Utawarerumono (2006)

Omake episodes

OVA

Utawarerumono: The False Faces (2015–2016)

See also
 List of Utawarerumono characters

References 

Utawarerumono